David Duane Freudenthal (born October 12, 1950) is an American attorney, economist, and politician who served as the 31st Governor of Wyoming from 2003 to 2011. Freudenthal previously was the United States Attorney for the District of Wyoming from 1994 to 2001.

Biography

Education and career
Dave Freudenthal was born in Thermopolis, the seat of Hot Springs County in north central Wyoming, the seventh of eight children; he grew up on a farm north of town. He graduated in 1973 from Amherst College in Amherst, Massachusetts, with a bachelor's degree in economics. After graduating he joined the Department of Economic Planning and Development as an economist and later became the state planning director for Governor Edgar Herschler.

Freudenthal received his J.D. degree from the University of Wyoming College of Law in 1980 and went into private practice. After retiring as governor, Freudenthal briefly worked at the law firm of Crowell & Moring as senior counsel in the firm's Cheyenne, Wyoming office.

Political career
In 1994, upon the recommendation of Governor Mike Sullivan, Freudenthal was appointed United States Attorney for the District of Wyoming. He left this post in May 2001 and was replaced by future governor Matt Mead.

In 2002, Freudenthal contested the Democratic primary for the gubernatorial election held later that year and won with over 50% of the vote against a field of opponents. He went on to be elected Governor of Wyoming on November 5, 2002 with 50% of the vote. He ran for reelection on November 7, 2006, and improved his vote count to 70%, sweeping every county in the state. Freudenthal announced on March 4, 2010 that he would not attempt to seek a third term as governor after speculation he would push to repeal state law on term limits; that law limited governors to eight years in office during a 16-year period.

Freudenthal remained consistently popular with his constituents throughout his tenure, even though he was a Democrat in a state that had turned almost solidly Republican. As governor he often took rather conservative positions, leading to disagreements with federal officials and environmental groups. In fact, Freudenthal and his eventual Republican successor, Matt Mead, notably held similar positions on various issues. The majority of his two terms oversaw an enormous energy boom and surpluses in government revenue, although this was later reversed after the Great Recession; Freudenthal then called for cuts to state agencies as growth continued to slow. In June 2007, following the death of US Senator Craig Thomas he appointed Republican John Barrasso to the United States Senate.

Personal life
Freudenthal is married to Nancy D. Freudenthal, a native of Cody, who serves as a judge on the United States District Court for the District of Wyoming. They have four children: Donald, Hillary, Bret and Katie. In 2008, while serving as Governor, Freudenthal underwent surgery on his shoulder; during this time Secretary of State Max Maxfield served as acting governor for a short time.

Electoral history

Notes

External links
 

|-

|-

1950 births
Living people
American Episcopalians
Amherst College alumni
Episcopalians from Wyoming
Democratic Party governors of Wyoming
People from Thermopolis, Wyoming
State cabinet secretaries of Wyoming
United States Attorneys for the District of Wyoming
University of Wyoming College of Law alumni
Wyoming lawyers